Aspects (also released as The Jazz Calendar of Benny Carter) is an album by saxophonist/composer Benny Carter recorded in  late summer 1958 and originally released by the United Artists label the following year.

Reception

AllMusic reviewer Scott Yanow stated: "Although originally associated with big bands, the set has what was Benny Carter's only big-band recording as a playing leader during 1947–86. While the song titles are a bit gimmicky, saluting the 12 months of the year, the music is solid, mainstream big-band swing. ... Two overlapping big bands were utilized, and the music alternates between being forceful and lyrical."

Track listing
All compositions by Benny Carter, except where indicated.
 "June in January" (Ralph Rainger, Leo Robin) – 3:12
 "February Fiesta" (Hal Schaefer) – 1:54
 "March Wind" – 3:16
 "I'll Remember April" (Gene de Paul, Patricia Johnston, Don Raye) – 3:21
 "One Morning in May" (Hoagy Carmichael, Mitchell Parish) – 2:49
 "June Is Bustin' Out All Over" (Richard Rodgers, Oscar Hammerstein II) – 2:59	
 "Sleigh Ride in July" (Jimmy Van Heusen, Johnny Burke) – 2:50
 "August Moon" – 3:39
 "September Song" (Kurt Weill, Maxwell Anderson) – 2:39
 "Something for October" – 2:52
 "Swingin' in November" – 3:02	
 "Roses in December" (Ben Oakland, Herb Magidson, George Jessel) – 2:36
 "February Fiesta" [mono take] (Schaefer) – 1:55 Additional track on CD reissue
 "June Is Bustin' Out All Over" [mono take] (Rogers, Hammerstein) – 3:00 Additional track on CD reissue
 "August Moon" [mono take] – 3:33 Additional track on CD reissue
 "Swingin' in November" [mono take] – 3:05 Additional track on CD reissue

Personnel 
Benny Carter – alto saxophone, arranger
Tracks 1, 2, 4, 5, 8, 9 & 13:
Pete Candoli, Conrad Gozzo, Uan Rasey, Shorty Sherock – trumpet
Herbie Harper, Tommy Pederson, George Roberts – trombone 
Buddy Collette, Chuck Gentry, Justin Gordon, Bill Green – saxophone
Arnold Ross  – piano
Larry Bunker – vibraphone
Bobby Gibbons – guitar
Joe Comfort – bass
Shelly Manne – drums
Tracks 3, 6, 7, 10–12 & 14–16:
Joe Gordon, Al Porcino, Ray Triscari, Stu Williamson – trumpet
Russ Brown,, Tommy Pederson, Frank Rosolino – trombone
Buddy Collette, Jewell Grant, Bill Green, Plas Johnson – saxophone
Gerald Wiggins – piano
Barney Kessel – guitar
Joe Comfort – bass
Shelly Manne – drums

References 

1959 albums
Benny Carter albums
United Artists Records albums
Albums arranged by Benny Carter